Vangjel Mile (born 1 July 1986) is an Albanian retired footballer who last played as a striker for Egnatia in the Albanian First Division.

Club career

Early career
Mile joined the Norwegian First Division side Kongsvinger in February 2006 and after he received his work-permit he played five matches for the team in the 2006 Norwegian First Division.

Laçi
On 20 August 2017, Mile joined Albanian Superliga side Laçi on a one-year deal. He made his first appearance for Laçi in the goalless draw against his former side Teuta Durrës in the opening matchday one day later. His first score-sheet contributions came in the 4th matchday where he scored the winner against Elbasani. Mile concluded his first and only season at Laçi by netting 5 goals in 30 league appearances, as the team finished in a historic 4th place.

Shkumbini Peqin
In January 2013, Mile signed with fellow top flight side Shkumbini Peqin for the second part of 2012–13 season in their bid to escape relegation, joining his father who was the manager at that time. He stated that playing for Shkumbini was an honour and privilege, adding that he did not think twice about signing with the club. His made his first appearance for the club on 10 February by starting in a 3–0 defeat to Teuta Durrës. Shkumbini mathematically relegated after losing 1–0 to Laçi on 28 April, returning to the Albanian First Division after 19 years. Mile opened his scoring account for Shkumbini later on 4 May in the matchday 25 against Tomori Berat, netting a brace for a 2–1 win. One week later he scored another one as Shkumbini ended the season with a 2–1 win at Luftëtari Gjirokastër. Mile's contract run out following end of the season, and the parties decided to end their cooperation, making Mile a free agent in the process. He finished his Shkumbini Peqin career by making 10 league appearances and scoring 3 goals, in addition 3 matches and 1 goal in cup.

PK-35 Vantaa
In April 2014, after Bylis was banned from the championship, Mile moved for the second time outside the country and signed with PK-35 Vantaa of Ykkönen.

Tomori Berat
On 16 September 2015, Mile completed a transfer to Albanian First Division side Tomori Berat as a free agent.

Erzeni
In January 2016, Mile joined Albanian Second Division side Egnatia as a free agent.

Egnatia
In September 2016, Mile joined Albanian Second Division side Egnatia by penning a one-year contract. He was handed the captaincy and made his competitive debut on 16 October in a 2–0 away defeat to Partizani Tirana B in the second matchday. One week later, Mile scored a late goal home against Veleçiku Koplik as Egnatia overturned the score to win 2–1 in the last minutes. After going scoreless for 6 matches, 540 minutes, Mile returned to the scoresheet by netting a brace in a 2–0 home win over Internacional Tirana in the matchday 9. He scored his first goal of 2017 in a 2–1 home win over Partizani Tirana B, helping Egnatia to extend the league gap to 11 points. Mile scored his first hat-trick of the season on 7 May 2017 in the matchday 25 against Tirana B, finished in a 0–6 away win, which put him on double figures. Mile ended the regular season with 12 goals in 21 matches, as Egnatia finished first in Group A, returning to Albanian First Division after 10 years. In the grand final against the winner of Group B Naftëtari Kuçovë, managed by his father, Mile scored a brace, as Egnatia won 4–1 to be crowned as Albanian Second Division champion.

Mile extended his deal with the club for another season. In the opening matchday of Albanian First Division, Mile started and scored an early goal as Egnatia opened the championship with a 1–0 home win over Vllaznia Shkodër B.

International career
Mile captained the Albanian U-19 team during qualifying for the 2006 UEFA European Under-17 Football Championship.

Personal life
He is the son of Kristaq Mile who is the manager Naftëtari Kuçovë. He married Vojsava in May 2012.

References

External links

1986 births
Living people
Sportspeople from Berat
Association football forwards
Albanian footballers
Albania under-21 international footballers
Albania youth international footballers
FK Dinamo Tirana players
Kongsvinger IL Toppfotball players
KF Teuta Durrës players
Besa Kavajë players
KF Laçi players
FK Tomori Berat players
KS Shkumbini Peqin players
KF Bylis Ballsh players
PK-35 Vantaa (men) players
KF Erzeni players
KS Egnatia Rrogozhinë players
Kategoria Superiore players
Norwegian First Division players
Ykkönen players
Kategoria e Parë players
Albanian expatriate footballers
Expatriate footballers in Norway
Expatriate footballers in Finland
Albanian expatriate sportspeople in Norway
Albanian expatriate sportspeople in Finland